The 1922 Auckland Rugby League was the 14th in its history. There were 68 teams playing across the various grades. City Rovers won the first grade championship for the 5th time, with Ponsonby winning the Roope Rooster for the 2nd time. City Rovers also defended the Challenge Shield, warding off efforts from Petone, Tongariro, and Huntly to lift it from them. Bill Davidson set a record for points scored in an Auckland club rugby league season with 116 for City Rovers. He and his brothers Ben and George between them scored 186 of City Rover's 339 points which was also a competition record for a team in a single season. City scored a further 19 points in the Roope Rooster competition and 85 points in their 3 Challenge Shield matches for 443 points in all official games.

It was an incredibly busy year for the Auckland representative team. They played more matches than some club teams had played in earlier seasons with ten matches in total. There was also an Auckland Provincial team match against New South Wales, and one Auckland B fixture with the team making the trip down to Cambridge to play the local side. Bill Davidson also led the representative team in scoring with 37 points.

Auckland rugby league news

Junior Management Committee
The junior management committee elected for the season was L. Binns, J.S. White, K. Lippiatt, G.J. Flynn, W. Baskett, William Mincham, O.O. Riley, D.C. Adamson, W.E. Frost, Bill Davidson (Hon. Sec), A. Freeman (Chairman), G.H. Seagar, A.H. Te Mete, T.B. Carpenter, W. Dowle, G.F. Burgess, J. Curtis, F. Cleal, W. Boag, F. Kennedy.

Carlaw Park 
At a pre-season meeting of the management committee it was discussed that Carlaw Park needed more ‘modern equipment’, and it was decided that “the establishment of more modern methods of dealing with the turf and the purchase of more efficient machinery shall be an early charge on the new season's funds”. Sufficient money was made from gates at club and rep fixtures at Carlaw Park and the Auckland Domain to begin improvements on the ground at the conclusion of the season.

New clubs and name changes 
The Auckland Rugby League accepted a new club named Mangere. They entered a team in the 2nd Grade.

The Maritime club also changed their name to ‘Athletic’. Their club colours were also changed from red, white and blue to royal blue with a gold band. In 1926 they were to change their name again to Grafton Athletic. This was not to be confused with Grafton Athletic who had existed as a team from 1914–1920 under the leadership of Karl Ifwersen and were presently playing under the name of 'Fire Brigade'.

Richmond Rovers applied for entry into the Senior A Grade competition and this was approved. This made the competition an even 8 teams meaning 4 matches per round and no byes. Unlike most previous seasons there were no byes, no defaults, and no postponed matches meaning 56 matches were played in total, easily the most in the competitions history. Richmond would go on to finish 7th with 3 wins and 11 losses.

George Davidson's return 
George Davidson played for Maritime (now named Athletic) in the 1919 season but had missed most of the 1920 and 1921 seasons as he was training for and competing at the Antwerp Olympics where he came 5th in the 200m final. He stated that over those two seasons he had only played for Maritime on two or three occasions as he was seeking a transfer to the City Rovers where his two brothers Bill and Ben played. Athletic were denying his request and Davidson appealed to the league who then asked the Athletics club to reconsider his request "favourably". He would eventually have his transfer to City approved.

Point Chevalier
Point Chevalier secured the use of Richard and Elizabeth Walker's paddock at the bottom of Humariri Street as their home ground. It has since become Walker Park where they are to this day located. In the same season they bought jerseys from George Court & Co. Ltd. In 1925 a shed was built at Walker Park with volunteer labour.

Monteith Shield (1st grade championship)

Monteith Shield standings 
{|
|-
|

Monteith Shield fixtures

Round 1 
Peter Irwin James Francis Hing, better known as James Hing, or later Sonny Hing scored a try for Ponsonby. He had previously played for Marist and would later coach the Point Chevalier premier side in the 1930s. He was the son of Charles A'Hing and Margaret Mary Irwin and was one of the first ever rugby league players in New Zealand with Chinese ancestry along with Arthur Singe.

Round 2 
In the match between Athletic and Ponsonby Eric Grey had a highly unusual collection of points after he scored a try, and kicked a conversion, a penalty, a goal from a mark, and a drop goal. Bert Laing transferred to Devonport during the week and had the unusual distinction of scoring against a team and then for a team in the space of a week.

Round 3

Round 4

Round 5

Round 6

Round 7

Round 8

Round 9

Round 10

Round 11

Round 12

Round 13

Round 14

Roope Rooster knockout competition
The loss by Athletic in the final was remarkably their 5th consecutive loss in the Roope Rooster final (their previous 4 under the name or Maritime).

Round 1

Semi finals

Final

Top try scorers and point scorers
These lists include tries and points scored in the First Grade competition and the Roope Rooster competition only. Bill Davidson set a record for the number of points scored by a single player in a season. While earlier seasons were often incomplete with some points unattributed his 116 points was well ahead of the previous highest of 78 by Karl Ifwersen in the 1915 season. P Gallagher of Marist was the top try scorer with 15.

Challenge shield matches 
City Rovers came into the season as holders of the trophy after defeating Ponsonby United the previous season. The shield had taken the place of the Thacker Shield which had been taken from Ponsonby and returned to the Canterbury Rugby League after a dispute over who was eligible to compete for it. City went on to defend the shield 3 times during the season defeating Petone, Tongariro, and Huntly.

City v Petone

City v Tongariro
The Tongariro team was “made up of Maori players drawn from the scattered settlements of the King Country” according to the New Zealand Herald match report, though were missing some of their best players. The Auckland Star reported that many of their players were graduates of Te Aute College.

City v Huntly
Huntly came to Auckland as the South Auckland (Waikato) champions and were expected to provide a stern test to City however after a competitive first half they fell away badly in the second half with City ending up running in 11 tries.

Lower grades 
There were 7 lower grades in 1922 if you include the Sixth Grade which was split into an A and B grade and the Cadet Competition. Mr. G. Davis donated a trophy for the junior club with the most points and it was won by Richmond, with City second and Ponsonby third.

Second grade
City Rovers defeated Devonport United 16–13 in the final on September 2. Marist and Ellerslie had withdrawn after 2 rounds, Newton withdrew after 8, Athletic after 9, and Otahuhu after 10. A knockout competition involving the nine teams still remaining from the championship, and Newton who had reformed their team began on September 9. On October 28 Manukau defeated Newton 19-11 in the final played at Manukau. On September 16 a Junior rep side made up of players from this grade played against the Wednesday Representative side and lost 16-8. The match was played as a curtain-raiser to the Auckland - New South Wales at Carlaw Park.
{|
|-
|

Third grade (Myers Cup)
Ponsonby United won the championship with an undefeated record, beating Kingsland Rovers 9-3 in what was labelled the final, on September 23, although Kingsland had lost at least 3 matches prior to this. A large number of results were unreported though the majority of Ponsonby and Point Chevalier's results were. Manukau defaulted their first two matches and then withdrew. City B withdrew after 12 rounds, Devonport and Coromandel Old Boys withdrew after 14 rounds.
{|
|-
|

Fourth grade
Richmond played Otahuhu on September 23 for the championship. The match was drawn 5-5 but Richmond secured the title as they were 1 competition point ahead going into the match. A large number of results were not reported, with just 3 of Otahuhu's reported thus their tally of 6 wins is based purely on the fact that they finished 1 pt behind Richmond. Richmond only had 8 results reported from their 14 scheduled matches. City withdrew after 11 rounds.
{|
|-
|

Fifth grade (Endean Memorial Shield)
Richmond defeated Takapuna on September 2 to win the championship. The majority of the results were not reported so the standings are significantly incomplete.
{|
|-
|

Sixth grade A
City Rovers A won the competition ahead of Richmond and Athletic. A standalone match was played between City and Athletic on September 16 to end the season and this was possible to decide the title. Northcote & Birkenhead Ramblers withdrew after 3 rounds. A large number of the results were not reported.
{|
|-
|

Sixth grade B
Athletic won the competition. The majority of match results were not reported so the standings are significantly incomplete. Athletic only had 3 match results reported and 2 of those were losses. Ponsonby defaulted in round 1 and withdrew from the competition.
{|
|-
|

Cadet competition
22nd Company, based in the City won the competition. They sealed the title when they beat 36th Company (Northcote) with a 13-0 win on September 30. It was slightly confusing as teams went by different names, sometimes being referred to by their company number and sometimes by their geographical location, whilst City were also called "Athletic" on occasion. Then on July 8 a team joined the competition simply known as Takapuna. Presumably this was also a cadet side rather than the club team of the same name.
{|
|-
|

Wednesday Competition
On September 13 a Taxi Drivers side beat Bakers 21-9 at Carlaw Park. A Bakers player (T. McPherson) broke his ankle and was taken home). On September 20 the Post and Telegraph side played against the Wednesday representative team as curtain-raiser to the Auckland Province - New South Wales match at Carlaw Park. Post and Telegraph won 33 to 11 with future New Zealand international Arthur Singe scoring 2 tries and kicking a conversion. Wally Somers was also in the Post and Telegraph side.

Representative season 
It was an extremely busy season for the Auckland representative side. They played ten matches in total, while many members of the side also played for the Auckland Provincial team, and an Auckland B team also played a match in Cambridge. Of the ten matches they lost 6 and won 4. The first representative fixture of the season was played on 20 May between Auckland and the Maori team which was preparing to visit Australia and play a series of matches. There were 7,000 in attendance and gate receipts totaled £297 2s 6d. On 19 June the touring Australian Universities Rugby League team arrived in Auckland on board the ‘Manuka’. They were welcomed at a function at the Auckland Town Hall by a large assembly of Auckland politicians including the Mayor Mr. J.H. Gunson, and representatives of Auckland Rugby League and the New Zealand League Council. The Australians acquitted themselves well by beating Auckland twice, and losing to them once and a loss to the South Waikato team in Hamilton. The games were played over the space of just 8 days.

After the NZ Māori team returned from their tour of Australia seven members of their team were transferred to the Fire Brigade Club, though only four played in their round 9 match (Pitman, Gardner, Yeats and Te Whata).

History was made on 2 September when Auckland was defeated for the first time in a Northern Union Challenge Cup match. They had held the Cup for over a decade, but had to hand it over when they were defeated by South Auckland 21 to 20 on Carlaw Park in front of a large crowd. On 16 September they met the touring New South Wales team at the Auckland Domain and in front of a huge crowd of 20,000 they went down in a “tremendously fast and exciting game” by 45 points to 25.

Auckland v New Zealand Maori
The Auckland team was not at full strength with 5 players originally selected unable to play.

Auckland v Australian Universities
The Australian University team was made up of players from Sydney University and Brisbane University.

Auckland v Australian Universities
Bill Stormont injured his knee during the match and was replaced by Ernie Herring. Herring took his place in the starting side for the third match due to the injury.

Auckland v Australian Universities
Nelson Bass and Ivan Littlewood were originally named to start however Turner and John McGregor both took their places in the starting lineup.

Auckland v Cambridge
Remarkably 12 of the 13 Auckland players scored points, with 8 separate players scoring tries and 4 others kicking one or more goal. The only player not to register any points for Auckland was second rower, Henry Hawkes.

Auckland v Hawkes Bay (Northern Union Challenge Cup)

Cambridge v Auckland B
William Southernwood of Ponsonby played for the Auckland B side. He would be tragically killed in a boating accident just prior to the start of the 1923 season which also claimed the lives of three other men. His team mate and New Zealand representative Bill Walsh survived the accident.

Auckland v South Auckland (Northern Union Challenge Cup)

Auckland v New South Wales
Auckland played the touring New South Wales team in front of 20,000 spectators at the Auckland Domain but was heavily defeated with Australian legend Frank Burge running in 5 tries. George Davidson replaced his brother Bill Davidson in the starting side, and Lou Brown came on during the first half to replace the injured Frank Delgrosso, while for New South Wales O'Connor replaced Tye who was also injured in the first half.

Auckland Province v New South Wales
A few days after the match with New South Wales an Auckland provincial team took on the touring side. This was the first ever Auckland provincial side which included Auckland club players and also players from the Waikato. The Auckland team was made up entirely of Auckland club players aside from former Auckland player Tim Peckham who was playing at Huntly. They also included Bill Te Whata who had played in Australia for the New Zealand Māori side and recently joined the Fire Brigade club in Auckland. They lost a tight match by 21 points to 20. Frank Burge was ordered off for disputing Wilson's try late in the match.

South Auckland v Auckland (Northern Union Challenge Cup)

Bay of Plenty v Auckland

Auckland representative matches played and scorers

Auckland

Auckland Province

Auckland B

References

External links 
 Auckland Rugby League Official Site

Auckland Rugby League seasons
Auckland Rugby League